Finegan Kruckemeyer (born 1981) is an Australian playwright.

Early life
Kruckemeyer was born in 1981  in Cork, Ireland, of a German father and Irish mother. The family moved to Adelaide, South Australia when Finegan was eight years old, and he attended Unley Primary School and Glenunga High School and became involved with Unley Youth Theatre.

Career
Kruckemeyer honed his skills working with Independent Theatre and Brink Productions in Adelaide, before moving to Tasmania in his mid-twenties to pursue a career as a playwright.

His work has been performed in over 200 international festivals; all Australian states and territories; eight US national tours; five UK national tours; and at venues including the Sydney Opera House (six works),  New York’s New Victory Theater (three works), Edinburgh’s Imaginate Festival (three works), Dublin’s Abbey Theatre,  Shanghai’s Malan Flower Theatre and DC’s Kennedy Center.

Recognition and awards
He was an inaugural recipient of the Sidney Myer Creative Fellowship in 2011, an award of  given to mid-career creatives and thought leaders.

He was the recipient of the 2015 David Williamson Prize for Excellence in Australian Playwrighting (a category in the AWGIEs), and the 2017 international Mickey Miner Lifetime Achievement Award for services to Theatre for Young Audiences.

He and his work have received dozens of awards, including seven AWGIE Awards, the Helpmann Award for Children’s Theatre, Rodney Seaborn Award, Jill Blewett's Playwright's Award and Colin Thiele Scholarship.

Other roles
Finegan has been a speaker at the Ubud Writers Festival in Bali, Indonesia, the Edinburgh International Children’s Theatre Festival (Scotland), TYA USA National Conference, and the ITYARN Conference (Argentina), among others. He has delivered papers or sat on panels at conferences/festivals in nine countries, with papers published.

He was one of 21 selected worldwide for the ASSITEJ Next Generation (young leaders in children’s theatre), and has sat on numerous arts boards including the Australian Script Centre and Tasmanian Arts Advisory Board, Arts Tasmania’s Assistance to Individuals, Tas Literary Awards and Artsbridge panels, and the Story Island Project board (promoting youth literacy and empowerment through storytelling with marginalised young people).

Plays

References

External links
 
 Finegan Kruckemeyer at AusStage

Living people
Australian dramatists and playwrights
1981 births